Killyleagh is a village and civil parish in County Down, Northern Ireland. It is on the A22 road between Belfast and Downpatrick, on the western side of Strangford Lough. It had a population of 2,483 people in the 2001 Census. It is best known for its twelfth century Killyleagh Castle. Killyleagh lies within the Newry, Mourne and Down district.

Demography
Killyleagh is classified as an intermediate settlement by the Northern Ireland Statistics and Research Agency (NISRA) (i.e. with population between 2000 and 4000 people).
On Census day (29 April 2001) there were 2,483 people living in Killyleagh. Of these:
22.5% were aged under 16 years and 20.3% were aged 60 and over
49.5% of the population were male and 50.5% were female
60.4% were from a Protestant background and 37.8% were from a Catholic background
4.4% of people aged 16–75 were unemployed.

Places of interest
Killyleagh Castle is a private family residence that is said to be the oldest inhabited castle in Ireland. It has been the home of the Hamilton family since the 17th century Plantation of Ulster and acquired its fairy-tale silhouette in the 1850s when the turrets were added, but it is mostly the same castle that the second Earl of Clanbrassil rebuilt in 1666. The castle hosts occasional concerts. In the past performers have included Van Morrison, Arlo Guthrie, Jackson Browne, Glen Hansard and Bap Kennedy.
Delamont Country Park is just outside Killyleagh on the road to Downpatrick.

People

It was the birthplace of Sir Hans Sloane, 1st Bt. He began collecting plants and birds' eggs on the shores of Strangford Lough and his accumulation grew into a priceless collection that formed the nucleus of the British Museum. He was also personal physician to King George II.
Reverend Edward Hincks, a renowned Assyriologist and Egyptologist, was appointed Church of Ireland rector of Killyleagh in 1825, an office he was to hold for the remaining forty-one years of his life.
Killyleagh's adjacent townland, Moymore, was the birthplace of William Carr, who emigrated to Pittsburgh USA, became an entrepreneur and left his fortune "to his Irish relatives."
Henry Cooke was the minister of 1st Presbyterian Church, who went on to become Moderator of the General Assembly and a leading exponent of orthodox Presbyterianism in Belfast in the mid 19th century. His statue in Belfast, standing outside the Royal Belfast Academical Institution, is known as "The Black Man".
Killyleagh is the home town of David Healy, the retired Northern Ireland football player. Healy is Northern Ireland's record goalscorer by a considerable distance, with 36 goals. The second highest total is 20 goals. He also holds the record for most goals scored in a European Championship Qualifying Phase, with 13 goals during the country's failed bid to reach Euro 2008. Healy's former Bury teammate Trevor Carson is also from Killyleagh.
 The present Duke of York, The Prince Andrew, also has the title Baron Killyleagh.
Robert Lowry (1824–1904), born in Killyleagh, emigrated to the United States and became a judge and U.S. Representative from Indiana.
Thomas L. Young (1832-1888), born in Killyleagh, served as Governor of Ohio from 1877 to 1878.
Henry Blackwood (1781–1830), born and buried in Killyleagh, vice admiral in the Royal Navy.

Twin town
Killyleagh is twinned with Cleveland, North Carolina, United States.

Civil parish of Killyleagh
The civil parish is mainly in the barony of Dufferin, with one townland in the barony of Castlereagh Upper. It also contains the village of Killyleagh.

Townlands
The civil parish contains the following townlands:

Ardigoa
Ballyalgan
Ballygoskin
Ballymacarron
Ballymacromwell
Ballytrim
Ballywillin
Clay
Cluntagh
Commons
Corbally
Corporation
Derryboy
Dodd's Island
Dunnyneill Islands
Gibb's Island
Island Taggart
Killinchy in the Woods
Kirkland and Toy
Lisinaw
Moymore
Mullagh
Pawle Island
Rathcunningham
Ringdufferin
Simmy Island
Toy and Kirkland
Tullykin
Tullymacnous
Tullyveery

Sport
Killyleagh Youth F.C. play association football in the Northern Amateur Football League.

See also
Market houses in Northern Ireland
List of civil parishes of County Down

References

External links

Killyleagh Primary School
Brief History of Killyleagh

 
Villages in County Down
 
Former boroughs in Northern Ireland